Pundit Arena (styled as PUNDIT ARENA) with url punditarena.com, is an Irish sports website focusing on association football, rugby union, gaelic sports, mixed martial arts and golf. It was co-founded by University College Cork graduates, Richard Barrett and Ross O'Dwyer. In June 2019 the website was announced as the exclusive broadcaster of the LGBT+ inclusive Dublin 2019 edition of the Union Cup rugby tournament.

References

External links

Nowgoal Website

Irish sport websites
English-language websites
Association football websites
2013 establishments in Ireland
Mass media companies of Ireland